Nanyang is a Town in Shanghang County, Longyan, Fujian.

Administration
The town executive, party subbranch and police substation (paichusuo, 派出所) are in Shaxiaba. The town oversees twenty official villages: 
 Shuangxi
 Sheshan 
 Haodong
 Jitou
 Xiache
 Xukeng 
 Mayangdong 
 Nankeng
 Nanyang
 Gongyu 
 Xinlian
 Luofang
 Huangfang
 Chaxi
 Lianyi
 Rixin
 Zhuxie 
 Lianshan
 Xiangta
 Nanling

Notes and references

Township-level divisions of Fujian